Bardai-Zougra Airport  is a joint public/military airport located near Bardai, Tibesti, Chad.

See also
List of airports in Chad

References

External links 
 Airport record for Bardai-Zougra Airport at Landings.com

Airports in Chad
Tibesti Region